The Ark Project or Ark Project of Freedom was an organisation co-founded by Susan Mesinai in March 1991  in Waterbury, Connecticut, to find out information on non-Russians taken prisoner by the former Soviet Union.  These have included Raoul Wallenberg, American military POWs and others. Mesinai was a former program director of The Raoul Wallenberg Committee of the United States.

While searching for American POWs, the group discovered Victor Norris Hamilton in 1992.

Notes

Vietnam War POW/MIA issues
Organizations established in 1991
Organizations based in Connecticut
Soviet Union–United States relations
1991 establishments in Connecticut